Michael Brandon (born February 9, 1965) is an American, pornographic actor and director (formerly exclusive to Raging Stallion Studios) who specializes in gay pornography. He has had his own subdivision at Raging Stallion called "Monster Bang" and has previously participated in some charitable efforts.

Career
Brandon helped set up Raging Stallion Studios and has stated that he started in porn after answering an ad in Frontiers magazine. He began his career in porn in 1989.  In 1990 and again in 1997, Brandon was convicted on drug possession charges and eventually spent three years in jail. In 2007 he was arrested again for drug possession. He also directed, produced, and wrote Passport to Paradise.

Brandon appeared in nearly 200 films between 1999 and 2006, and he eventually directed his own line of films known as the "MonsterBang videos". He has engaged in what appeared to be a very busy escorting career that was documented on his website and on an online escort review site (Daddysreviews.com).

In 2011 he became Vice President of 9X6 Lube.

In 2013 he co-hosted Grabby Awards ceremony.

In 2014 he became new executive director of a community-based group that helps queer men in San Francisco.

Awards and nominations
Brandon won the "Performer of the Year" at the 2001 GayVN Awards and tied for that same award in 2002 with Colton Ford. At the 2002 Adult Erotic Video Awards ("The Grabbys"), he was named, with Chad Hunt, as "Best Performers". Brandon was added to the "Grabby Wall of Fame" in 2003 and received a "Surprise Award" Grabby for "Hottest Cock" in 2005.

Partial videography
 Czech Point (Studio 2000) (1999)
 Cadet Convoy (2005)
 Michael Brandon: Virtually Yours (2004)
 Down Right Dangerous (2003)
 Hard at Work (Raging Stallion) (2003)
 The List (MSR Videos) (2003)
 Plexus: Hardcore (2003)
 A Porn Star is Born (2003)
 The Sexus, Nexus and Plexus Trilogy (2002–2003)
 Cockpit 1 & 2 (Catalina Video) (2000–2003)
 Latin Tendencies (2002)
 Saluting Michael Brandon (2002)
 Trespass (Titan Media) (2002)
 In Gear (2001)
 Michael Brandon: Down & Dirty (2001)
 The Best of Michael Brandon (1999)
 Air Male (1989)

See also
 List of male performers in gay porn films
 List of Grabby recipients

References

External links
 
 
 
 

 

1965 births
American actors in gay pornographic films
American male pornographic film actors
American pornographic film directors
American pornographic film producers
Directors of gay pornographic films
Producers of gay pornographic films
Living people